This is a list of symphonies in C major written by notable composers.

Notes

References

Hill, George R.; Bryan, Paul R. (1981): "Thematic Index" in The Symphony 1720 - 1840 Series B - Volume X, ed. Barry S. Brooks. New York & London: Garland Publishing. .

See also

For symphonies in other keys, see List of symphonies by key.

C major
Symphonies